Patriot Hills Base Camp was a private seasonally occupied camp in Antarctica. It was located in the Heritage Range of the Ellsworth Mountains, next to the Patriot Hills that gave it its name.

The camp was run by the private company Adventure Network International (now Antarctic Logistics & Expeditions LLC, known as ALE),
a company that provides expedition support and tours to the interior of Antarctica. It was constructed in 1987  and used during the summer months of November to January. Patriot Hills was for many adventurers and explorers a stop on the way from Chile's Punta Arenas into the interior of Antarctica. The flight time from Punta Arenas is about 4.5 hours.

As of November 2010 ALE has moved operations. Union Glacier Camp is the new base of operations and Union Glacier Blue-Ice Runway SCGC is the new runway, 70 kilometers from Patriot Hills. Patriot Hills is being retained as a backup runway.

In the summer months the temperature rises to −15 °C. The temperature in the winter months is estimated to be about −40 °C, but no one has yet overwintered in the Ellsworth Mountains.

History
In the Antarctic spring of 1988 Patriot Hills was the staging point for the first expedition from Hercules Inlet to the South Pole, led by Martyn S. Williams. This 50-day expedition opened up the doorway for South Pole overland journeys, and has become the classic route for most expeditions.
In 1989 Patriot Hills was the staging point of the continental crossing by Reinhold Messner and Arved Fuchs that started at 82°S-72°W, crossed the South Pole to McMurdo Station.
It has also been the starting point for many expeditions to Mount Vinson, some 120 kilometers away.

In 1991, Patriot Hills was featured in episode eight of the BBC travel series Pole to Pole with Michael Palin.

See also
Blue-ice area
List of Antarctic field camps
 List of airports in Antarctica

Patriot Hills Blue-Ice Runway

The camp was built near one of the rare blue ice fields. A blue ice runway was used as the takeoff and landing strip for large intercontinental aircraft including DC6, L-382, C130 and Ilyushin Il-76.
 
The heart of the camp was the communal tent that serves as a common lounge and dining room. In the communications tent, using devices powered by solar power, high-frequency radio equipment maintained contact with Punta Arenas and the traveling expeditions. The residents of the camp were housed in two-person tents.

References

Further reading 
 Swithinbank, C.W.M. 1991. Potential airfield sites in Antarctica for wheeled aircraft. Hanover, USA, CRREL Report 91–24.
 Murphy J. 1990. South to the Pole By Ski.
 OpenStreetMap

Outposts of Antarctica
Airports in Antarctica
Chilean Antarctic Territory
Ellsworth Mountains
1987 establishments in Antarctica